Greengates is a small suburban area in the north-east of the city of Bradford, West Yorkshire, in  England.
The area is bordered by Idle and Thackley to the north-west, and the large council estate known as Thorpe Edge to the west.
To the south of Greengates is Ravenscliffe housing estate with the village of Eccleshill beyond that.
The village of Apperley Bridge lies to the north.
To the east in the Leeds Metropolitan District is the village of Calverley.

History 

To the west of Greengates is Albion Mills a historic textile mill, destroyed by fire on 10 March 1911 but rebuilt.
In 1931 the Bradford trolleybus routes were extended from Idle to Greengates
with the service running along Albion Road and Leeds Road.

In 1928 a purpose built 595 seat cinema 'Greengates Cinema' was constructed on New Line for the Greengates Cinema Company.
This closed in 1959 and is now an Asda supermarket.

Governance 

Greengates is situated largely in the Idle and Thackley ward and partly in the Eccleshill ward.
It is represented as part of the parliamentary constituency of Bradford East.

Economy 

Greengates' proximity to the Leeds and Liverpool Canal, that runs through Apperley Bridge to the north of the village, has meant that Greengates has several mills.
At the western end is Robin Mills and Albion Mills.
Robin Mills was a base for manufacturing knitting wool yarns but is now split into industrial units.
A large part of Robin Mills is occupied by Storey Evans, carton, leaflet, label etc. printers for the pharmaceutical industry.
Albion Mills is split into office accommodation and business units.
There is the racing car themed Speedmaster Conference Centre, until recently notable for its classic, competition and racing car showroom and exhibition.
The centre was opened in April 2008 by Sir Stirling Moss.

On New Line, is the New Line Retail Park with a Subway, a veterinary surgery, Boots Chemist, and a beauty shop. A little past the New Line retail park is Rainbows nursery, the New Line micro pub that sits beside the New Line Auto Garage.
Eastwards between Harrogate Road and New Line in Greengates Retail Park is a Sainsbury's, B&M, Argos, Matalan, Costa, KFC.
and Core Gym.
Existing historic public houses in the area include The Albion and The Hogs Head.
The Seven Stars is now an Italian restaurant (Aldos), and The Roebuck public house was demolished to make way for a new Farmfoods store. The Cracker Barrel micro pub opened in April 2017, in the former Post Office on Harrogate Road.
There is also the Kebabeesh, Kiplings, Bhajis & Beer Indian restaurants. Also has two Chinese takeaways (China Garden and Empires Chinese), along with a Fish  and Chip shop.

Landmarks 

The area is centred on the crossroads of Leeds Road/New Line, and Harrogate Road.
Around this crossroads are most of the area's pubs, restaurants and shops, a Sainsbury's supermarket, Homebase, Argos and a Matalan.
Another feature is the large war memorial situated at the crossroads, that commemorates those who died in World War I and World War II from Greengates and the surrounding villages.
On Harrogate Road to the north of the main crossroads there is a large Anglican church dedicated to St. John the Evangelist.
Along this stretch of the Harrogate Road is Optegra Yorkshire Eye Hospital and Bettersight Advanced Eye and Vision Consultancy.
The post office is on New Line.

There are a number of listed buildings in Greengates.
These are to be found at Beck Bottom,
Carr Bottom Road,
Haigh Hall,
Harrogate Road,
New Line
and Stockhill Fold.

Education 

Greengates has its own primary school, Greengates Primary School, that moved northwards out of an older building on Leeds Road, to a new building across the road.
The old school building has now been transformed into fashion business premises.
Parkland Primary school, immediately behind Albion Mills, also serves Greengates and the neighbouring Thorpe Edge estate.

Transport 

The following bus services run to Greengates;
645: (First Bradford) Buttershaw - Greengates via Five Lane Ends and Bradford City Centre,

60: (Keighley Bus Company) Leeds - Keighley via Bingley and Saltaire,
747: (Flying Tiger) [Airport Direct] Bradford - Leeds Bradford Airport - Harrogate

The A657 Leeds Road / New Line runs east–west through Greengates while the A658 Harrogate Road runs approximately north–south.
Greengates does not have its own railway station: the nearest station is Apperley Bridge railway station just under a mile to the north.
The nearest airport to Greengates is Leeds Bradford Airport and can be accessed by bus service 747.

See also
Listed buildings in Idle and Thackley
Listed buildings in Bradford (Eccleshill Ward)

References

External links 

Areas of Bradford